The South Central Rockies forests is a temperate coniferous forest ecoregion of the United States located mainly in Wyoming, Idaho, and Montana. It has a considerably drier climate than the North Central Rockies forest.

Setting
This ecoregion is located mainly in western Wyoming, but also in eastern and central Idaho, south-western and south-central Montana, northeastern Wyoming and southwestern South Dakota. It is centered on the Yellowstone Plateau, extending outward on connected mountain ranges, but the ecoregion also includes the isolated Bighorn Mountains and Black Hills, as well as smaller isolated ranges in central Montana. The area has a dry continental climate, with brief summers and long, cold winters.

Flora
The ecoregion is predominantly coniferous forest, dominated by lodgepole pine (Pinus contorta latifolia) due to relatively recent major fires in the area. Other trees include Engelmann spruce (Picea engelmanni), Rocky Mountain Douglas-fir (Pseudotsuga menziesii glauca), subalpine fir (Abies lasiocarpa) and trembling aspen (Populus tremuloides). Whitebark pine (Pinus albicaulis) is an important species at the upper tree line/krummholz zone. This ecoregion also contains mountain meadows, foothill grasslands, sagebrush steppes, riparian woodlands, and alpine tundra. In some areas, geothermal activity creates distinct, warm habitats with unique floral communities.

Fauna
Mammals of this ecoregion include elk (Cervus canadensis), mule deer (Odocoileus hemionus), bighorn sheep (Ovis canadensis), plains bison (Bison bison bison), Shiras moose (Alces alces shirasi), cougar (Puma concolor), grizzly bear (Ursus arctos horribilis), northwestern wolf (Canis lupus occidentalis), black bear (Ursus americanus cinnamomum), bobcat (Lynx rufus) and Canada lynx (Lynx canadensis), coyote (Canis latrans), North American beaver (Castor canadensis), North American river otter (Lontra canadensis),  and snowshoe hare (Lepus americanus).

Birds are typical of the forested portions of the northern Rocky Mountains, including Steller's jay, black-capped chickadee, and pine siskin. This ecoregion boasts a very rich avifauna, including such specialists as white pelican, trumpeter swan, and (black) rosy finch. Other typical species include harlequin duck, Barrow's goldeneye, Swainson's hawk, bald eagle, osprey, sage grouse, sandhill crane, Franklin's gull, American dipper, Townsend's solitaire, yellow-rumped warbler, and Brewer's sparrow. Herpetofauna typical of this ecoregion are the spotted frog, prairie rattlesnake, rubber boa, boreal toad, and blotched tiger salamander.

Conservation status and protected areas
Though large portions of this ecoregion are protected, its conservation status is listed as "vulnerable". Indiscriminate logging of unprotected areas and the deaths of grizzly bears and possibly wolves by ungulate hunters are the main threats to this ecoregion's integrity. Protected areas include Yellowstone National Park in northwestern Wyoming, south-central Montana and eastern Idaho, Grand Teton National Park in western Wyoming, Cloud Peak Wilderness in north-central Wyoming, and Black Elk Wilderness in southwestern South Dakota.

See also
Greater Yellowstone Ecosystem
 List of ecoregions in the United States (WWF)

References

Forests of the Rocky Mountains
Rockies, South Central
Ecoregions of the United States
Forests of Idaho
Forests of Montana
Forests of South Dakota
Forests of Wyoming
South Central
South Central
Rockies, South Central
Nearctic ecoregions